The 115th Field Hospital ("Warrior Medics") is a field hospital of the United States Army formed in 1917 and perpetuated until today. The hospital has participated in World War I, World War II, Desert Storm, Operation Iraqi Freedom and Operation Enduring Freedom (Afghanistan). As of March 2019, the 115th Combat Support Hospital reorganized and re-designated as a field hospital and is now a component unit of the 32d Hospital Center.

Former command elements 
 Colonel Lee A. Burnett (CDR) 2018–2019
 Colonel David W. Wolken (CDR) 2016–2018
 Colonel Andrew E. Doyle (CDR) 2014–2016
 Colonel Kevin J. Stevens (CDR) 2012–2014
 Colonel Patricia Darnauer (CDR) 2009–2012 (OEF)
 Colonel John McGrath (CDR) 2006–2009 (OIF)
 Colonel Jeffrey Short (CDR) 2004–2006 (OIF)
 Colonel Donn Richards (CDR) 2002–2004 (OIF)
 Colonel Douglas Hewitt (CDR) 2000–2002
 Lieutenant Colonel Jim Solomon (CDR) 1994–1996

 Command Sergeant Major Michael Chavaree (CSM) 2019-present
 Command Sergeant Major Dolores Kiyoshi (CSM) 2018–2019
 Command Sergeant Major Felix Z. Infante III (CSM) 2016–2018
 Command Sergeant Major Edward D. Leonard (CSM) 2014–2016
 Command Sergeant Major William L. Majors (CSM)
 Command Sergeant Major Janine Osterberg (CSM)
 Command Sergeant Major Timothy Motes (CSM) (OEF)
 Command Sergeant Major Shirley Hunt (CSM) (OIF)
 Command Sergeant Major Reyes Perez (CSM) (OIF)
 Command Sergeant Major Cheryl Mathis (CSM) (OIF)

Lineage 
 Constituted 28 December 1917 in the Regular Army as Evacuation Hospital No. 15
 Organized 21 March 1918 at Fort Riley, Kansas
 Demobilized 28 June 1919 at Camp Lewis, Washington
 Reconstituted 9 November 1936 in the Regular Army and consolidated with the 15th Evacuation Hospital (constituted 1 October 1933 in the Regular Army) and consolidated unit designated as the 15th Evacuation Hospital
 Activated 1 June 1941 at Fort George G. Meade, Maryland
 Reorganized and redesignated 20 October 1943 as the 15th Evacuation Hospital, Semimobile
 Inactivated 8 September 1945 in Italy
 Redesignated 24 August 1949 as the 15th Evacuation Hospital and activated in Germany
 Reorganized and redesignated 10 November 1951 as the 15th Evacuation Hospital, Semimobile
 Reorganized and redesignated 1 October 1953 as the 15th Evacuation Hospital
 Reorganized and redesignated 21 December 1973 as the 15th Combat Support Hospital
 Reorganized and redesignated 16 March 1984 as the 15th Evacuation Hospital
 Reorganized and redesignated 16 October 1994 as the 115th Field Hospital
 Reorganized and redesignated 16 October 2005 as the 115th Combat Support Hospital
 Reorganized and redesignated 2019 as the 115th Field Hospital (a unit of the 32d Hospital Center)

Distinctive Unit Insignia
Description:   A silver color metal and enamel device 1 5/32 inches (2.94 cm) in height overall consisting of a silver cross couped, bearing an oak tree on a mound proper all above a maroon scroll bearing the motto "EVACUARE" in silver letters.

Symbolism:   The silver cross represents the activities of the Medical Corps, and the oak tree represents the service of the organization in the Meuse-Argonne Offensive during World War I.

Background:   The distinctive unit insignia was originally approved for the 15th Evacuation Hospital on 5 February 1942.  It was redesignated for the 15th Combat Support Hospital on 8 March 1974.  It was redesignated for the 15th Evacuation Hospital on 22 October 1984.  The insignia was redesignated effective 16 September 1993, for the 115th Field Hospital, with description revised.

History 
The 115th Field Hospital traces its origin to Evacuation Hospital #15, originally organized at Fort Riley, Kansas on 21 March 1918. At the onset of hostilities during World War I, the unit sailed aboard the "S.S. Mataika," departing the United States on 22 August 1918, and arriving in France 3 September 1918. Evacuation Hospital #15 earned a battle streamer for its participation in the Meuse-Argonne Forest offensive from 26 September 1918 through 11 November 1918. The hospital, having served honorably and proud during World War I, returned to the United States aboard the "S.S. America" and was demobilized at Camp Lewis, Washington on 28 June 1919. Evacuation Hospital #15 was reconstituted as the 15th Evacuation Hospital in 1936, after having been organized as an inactive unit of the Regular Army on 1 October 1933.

As the first hostilities of World War II began, the 15th Evacuation Hospital was again activated in a training status at Fort George G. Meade, Maryland. Shortly thereafter, the hospital was alerted for overseas deployment. Preparations for this move included the assignment of new personnel and equipment. On 8 February 1943, the 15th sailed aboard the "Susan B. Anthony," a converted passenger and cargo liner designed for 300 passengers, but redesigned to accommodate 2,700 troops. At this time, the unit had an assigned strength of: 39 officers, 48 nurses, 1 warrant officer and 248 enlisted men. Three days into the trip, the 15th learned that its destination was North Africa. On 21 February, the ship docked in Algeria, where the 15th unloaded its men and equipment and went into a staging area to await its first operational assignment. On 10 April 1943, the unit moved a distance of approximately 600 miles east to Tunisia, where it set up and began receiving patients. The 15th operated in a number of locations within the North African Theater until just prior to D-Day, 10 July 1943. At this point, the hospital sailed for the southern coast of Sicily, where it supported the beach-head established by allied forces. At one point during the Sicilian Campaign, the patient census rose to an astronomical figure of 978 inpatients. During this period (3 August 1943), Lieutenant General George S. Patton, Commanding General, 7th United States Army, paid a thirty-minute visit to the hospital, from that visit the often talked about "slapping incident" materialized.

The hospital moved to Italy and participated in both the Salerno and Anzio beach-heads. It was during the Anzio beach-head that the 15th came under heavy artillery attack, suffering numerous casualties. Several members of the unit were decorated for heroism during that period.

The 15th continued to move north through Italy, and on 10 June 1944, established itself in a schoolhouse near Rome. This was the first permanent- type building the 15th had operated out of in over 18 months. The hospital's comparatively comfortable life in Rome was short-lived, and on 21 June 1944, the 15th moved north in support of combat operations through Florence and the Po Valley into Milan, where it served until the end of hostilities.

In addition to several campaign streamers, including: Tunisia, Naples-Foggle, Rome-Arno, Po Valley, and North Apennines, the 15th Evacuation Hospital received the most prized award of all, the Meritorious Unit Citation, for its outstanding performance during World War II. Having served honorably and well, the unit was deactivated on 8 September 1945.

The 15th Evacuation Hospital was again reactivated on 25 August 1959, at Nuremberg, Germany, where it was responsible for the medical care of military and civilian personnel. The hospital acted as a MEDDAC and, in addition, operated various other medical activities throughout the Nuremberg area.

In 1961, the hospital moved to Kornwesteim, Germany and was constructed as a training unit without patients. During March 1963, the 15th once again began receiving patients and operated a 400-bed facility in Baumholder, Germany. In 1964, the hospital moved to Muenchweiler, Germany, where it again assumed a training posture without patients.

On 1 August 1968, the 15th Evacuation Hospital arrived at Fort Belvoir, Virginia after being airlifted from Rhein Mein Air Base, Germany during a period of troop reduction in Europe. On 21 January 1975, the 15th Evacuation Hospital was officially redesignated and reorganized as the 15th Combat Support Hospital, utilizing the new and conventional Medical Unit, Self-contained, Transportable (MUST) equipment which was capable of holding 100 to 300 patients and preparing them for further evacuation.

On 31 July 1975, the 15th Combat Support Hospital was alerted for deployment to Fort Indiantown Gap, Pennsylvania for the purpose of operating the Medical Treatment Facility, Task Force New Arrivals, providing comprehensive medical care to Indochinese refugees and task force personnel, both military and civilian. Movement of the 15th Combat Support Hospital to Fort Indiantown Gap began on 11 August 1975, and continued in increments until 22 August 1975, when the 15th officially took over operation of the Medical Treatment Facility at Fort Indiantown Gap.

During the period 22 August 1975 through 15 December 1975, the 15th treated 32 inpatients and evacuated an additional 137 patients. A total of 12,459 patients were seen on an outpatient basis. In addition, 8648 refugees were given dental care.

In March 1984, after nine years of distinguished service, the 15th Combat Support Hospital was reorganized and redesigned as the 15th Evacuation Hospital.

In March 1988, the 15th Evacuation Hospital began to prepare for the move from Fort Belvoir, Virginia to Fort Polk, Louisiana. The unit was officially deactivated in June 1988 and was reactivated in August at Fort Polk.

Officially reinstated, the 15th Evacuation Hospital became a valuable asset to the 5th Infantry Division. From 8 January 1991 to 26 April 1991, the hospital deployed to Saudi Arabia in support of Operation Desert Shield/Desert Storm. Iraqi POW's, women and children were primarily treated. Prior to deployment, the 15th was fielded with DEPMEDS (Deployable Medical Systems). In Feb 1993, the 15th Evacuation Hospital was redesignated the 115th Field Hospital.

The 115th deployed to Bosnia-Herzegovina from March to September 2000.

In support of Operation Iraqi Freedom, the 115th Combat Support Hospital deployed to Kuwait in 2003 and again to Adu Gharb Prison in Iraq from July 2004 to July 2005. During this most recent combat deployment, the 115th Combat Support Hospital, while under some of the most fierce combat conditions, created an entire system of Detention health Care from scratch, setting the standard for the Department of Defense to follow for years to come.

In support of Operation Iraqi Freedom, the 115th Combat Support Hospital deployed to Iraq for 15 months, 2008 to Aug 2009.  During the deployment, the unit had health service support at four different bases: care for Iranian refugees at Camp Ashraf, set up a new hospital and provided care for 5,000 detainees and area support at Camp Taji, managed a hospital at Camp Victory which provided care to 3,500 detainees and 40,000 Soldiers, Sailors and Airmen, and the southernmost post at Camp Bucca cared for 22,000 detainees and 12,000 coalition forces.

In support of Operation Enduring Freedom, the 115th Combat Support Hospital deployed to Camp Dwyer, Afghanistan in late 2009 to December 2011.  The 115th CSH provided level one, two and three health service preventive medicine support, while also leading a medical task force more than 400 strong that spanned the southwestern and western regions of Afghanistan.  They treated more than 1,500 in-patients and 15,500 outpatients since the beginning of the year.  They created a synchronized medical delivery system supported by a functional task force headquarters that facilitated communication, ensured adherence to standards of clinical practice and provided administrative support to direct reporting units", said Darnauer.

The 115th CSH and its subordinate units such as 6th Squad, 33rd Optical Detachment, 43rd Veterinary Detachment, 485th Preventive Medicine Detachment, and 565th Ground Ambulance Company, have deployed to various locations including: Bosnia, Haiti, Ecuador and Hungary. 115th Combat Support Hospital training deployments during this time included numerous JRTC rotations, Partnership for Peace exercises, a Bright Star rotation in Egypt, Operation Rolling Thunder, Operation Team Spirit, MEDEX 2000 in Japan and various other exercises. 

The 115th Combat Support Hospital was reorganized and redesignated as the 115th Field Hospital in March 2019 as part of the AMEDD restructuring of all Combat Support Hospitals to a new Field Hospital structure.  This new design created a Hospital Center HQ element, 32-bed field hospital (115th FH), and 3 detachments.  This new design was developed to allow for enhanced modularity.

On 5 February 1943, the present 565th Medical Company (Ground Ambulance) was constituted as Company B, 426th Ambulance Motor Battalion. It was activated on 25 February 1943 at Camp Maxey, Texas. It was reorganized as redesignated on 25 September 1943 as the 565th Ambulance Company, Motor. The unit was again reorganized and redesignated on 25 April 1945 and became the 565th Motor Ambulance Company. After the end of World War II in Europe, the unit was inactivated on 15 November 1945 at Camp Myles Standish, Massachusetts. During WWII the unit earned Campaign Participation Credit in Normandy, Northern France, Rhineland, Ardennes-Alsace, and Central Europe. On 23 May 1955, the 565th Medical Company was redesignated and allotted to the Regular Army. It was reactivated on 1 July 1955 at Baumholder, Germany. In 1990, the unit again responded when duty called and deployed to Southwest Asia in support of Operations Desert Shield and Desert Storm. They have also deployed to Kuwait and Haiti to provide medical support. Most recently the unit has been to Bosnia. In the Summer of 2010 the 565th Ground Ambulance Company was deactivated. At the time of their deactivation they were known as the "Renegades".

The 485th Medical Detachment was constituted on 29 July 1921 in the Organized Reserves as Company A, 343rd Medical Regiment. On 1 October 1933, the unit was transferred to the Regular Army. The unit was activated on 20 May 1943 at Fort Dix, New Jersey and assigned to the XIII Corps. In October 1944, the unit was sent to England and was subsequently sent to France, where it followed the war through Belgium and into Germany. On 30 November 1946, the unit was inactivated at Karlsruhe, Germany. On 18 February 1953, the unit was redesignated as the 485th Preventive Medicine Company activated in Germany. The unit was sent to France in March 1953. Over the years the unit was reorganized and redesignated as the 485th Medical Company (5 June 1953), the 485th Medical Laboratory (24 March 1962), the 485th Preventive Medicine Unit (17 June 1963), and the 485th Medical Detachment (Preventive Medicine) (21 June 1973). The 485th Medical Detachment proudly answered its nation's call when needed, and deployed to:  Lebanon (1958), Iran (1962), Morocco (1963), Yugoslavia (1963), Arkansas, Texas, Louisiana and Oklahoma (1971), Arkansas and Pennsylvania (1975), Colorado (1976), Somalia (1993), Surinam (1994), and Operations Spartan Shield and Inherent Resolve (2017). The unit is currently stationed at Fort Polk, Louisiana. "Vectorborne"

The 43rd Veterinary Detachment was constituted in the Army of the United States on 20 March 1944 in China. It was reorganized and redesignated as the 43rd Veterinary Animal Service Detachment on 16 March 1945. On 20 September 1945, the unit was inactivated in China. On 13 August 1951, the unit was redesignated as Headquarters, 43rd Veterinary Service Detachment and attached to the Regular Army. On 22 August 1951, the unit was activated at Camp Carson, Colorado. The unit was subsequently sent to France. On 15 January 1953, it was reorganized and redesignated as Headquarters, 43rd Medical Detachment. On 3 December 1954, the unit was again reorganized and redesignated to become the 43rd Medical Detachment. On 23 February 1967, the unit was inactivated in France. On 26 May 1967, the unit was reactivated at Fort Sam Houston, Texas and later served in Vietnam. On 26 December 1971, the unit was inactivated in Vietnam. On 1 October 1993, the unit was activated at Fort Hood, Texas as the 43rd Medical Detachment (Veterinary Services). Effective 16 June 1996, the 6th Squad, 43rd Medical Detachment (VS) was moved to Fort Polk, attached under the 115th Combat Support Hospital.  It later moved to Fort Hood under the command and control of the 21st Combat Support Hospital.

The 33rd Optical Detachment deployed to Iraq from 19 September 2009 to 3 August 2010 as a part of Iraqi Sovereignty and again from 19 April 2015 to 31 December 2015 to Kuwait in support of Operations Inherent Resolve, Spartan Shield, and Freedom's Sentinel. The unit also deployed to Iraq 26 September 2009. The detachment was awarded the Meritorious Unit Commendation on 20 July 2016 for service provided during deployment to Iraq. The unit was stationed at Fort Polk, LA until its deactivation on 3 August 2018. p

Campaign participation credit 
 World War I
 Meuse-Argonne
 World War II
 Tunisia
 Sicily
 Naples-Foggia
 Anzio
 Rome-Arno
 North Apennines
 Po Valley
 Southwest Asia
 Defense of Saudi Arabia
 Liberation and Defense of Kuwait
 Operation Iraqi Freedom
 Operation Enduring Freedom

Decorations 
 Meritorious Unit Commendation (Army) for EUROPEAN THEATER

Media 
The 115th Combat Support Hospital was featured on LT. Col Oliver North's "NRAs Life of Duty" while serving in Afghanistan in 2011.

References 

 115th Combat Support Hospital
 Video
 115th CSH under new leadership
 Medicine rewired at detainee combat hospital

0115